West Lafayette Community School Corporation is a top rated, public school district located in West Lafayette, Indiana. It has 2,316 students in grades K-12 with a student-teacher ratio of 16 to 1. According to state test scores, 72% of students are at least proficient in math and 72% in reading.

The West Lafayette Community School Corporation administers the following schools in West Lafayette, Indiana, United States:
 West Lafayette Elementary School (Formerly known as Cumberland Elementary School)
 West Lafayette Intermediate School
 West Lafayette Junior-Senior High School
The superintendent is Shawn Greiner.

External links
 West Lafayette Community School Corporation

School districts in Indiana
West Lafayette, Indiana
Education in Tippecanoe County, Indiana